The Écône consecrations were a set of episcopal consecrations that took place in Écône, Switzerland, on 30 June 1988. They were performed by Catholic Archbishop Marcel Lefebvre and Bishop Antonio de Castro Mayer, and the bishops who were consecrated were four priests of Lefebvre's Society of Saint Pius X (SSPX). The consecrations, performed against the explicit orders of Pope John Paul II, represented a milestone in the troubled relationship of Lefebvre and the SSPX with the Church leadership. The Holy See's Congregation for Bishops issued a decree signed by its Prefect Cardinal Bernardin Gantin declaring that Lefebvre had incurred automatic excommunication by consecrating the bishops without papal consent, thus putting himself and his followers in schism.

On 24 January 2009, Pope Benedict XVI lifted the excommunications of the four bishops Lefebvre had consecrated in 1988.

Canon law
Under the Catholic 1983 Code of Canon Law, canon 1013, the consecration of a bishop requires the permission of the Pope, and (unless a papal dispensation has been granted) at least three consecrating bishops. Violation of the rule requiring the Pope's permission entails automatic (latae sententiae) excommunication of both the consecrator and the recipient of the consecration. In this case there was not only an absence of permission but an actual prohibition by the Pope.

Lefebvre and his supporters argued that the circumstances under which the consecrations took place were such that none of the clergy involved was truly excommunicated. One of their arguments was that a "state of necessity" existed in which the ordinary provisions of canon law could be set aside. The Pontifical Council for Legislative Texts rejected this argument, stating in a 1996 explanatory note that "there is never a necessity to ordain Bishops contrary to the will of the Roman Pontiff". Consecrating a bishop without papal approval was also condemned by Pope Pius XII after the Chinese government set up the state-sanctioned Catholic Patriotic Association in 1957. Pius XII stated that the sacramental activity of illicitly consecrated bishops was "gravely" so, "that is, criminal and sacrilegious", and rejected the defence of necessity put forward by those involved.

Announcement of the consecrations
In the 1970s, Lefebvre had stated that he would not consecrate bishops to continue his work with the Society of St. Pius X (SSPX). It is alleged that in 1974 (at the age of 69) he told a confidant that he could not take such a step, "for this would mean I would do what Martin Luther did, and I would lose the Holy Ghost".

In the 1980s, Lefebvre's stance changed.  In 1983 (at the age of 78), while in the United States, he reportedly sounded out his American priests about the prospect of him consecrating bishops.  Those superiors who objected to the idea were removed from their posts as a result. In 1986–1987, the Society's adherents in St Mary's, Kansas, were required to attend a series of catechetical sessions in which they were prepared for the forthcoming consecrations and their fallout.

At the age of 82, Lefebvre first publicly announced his intention to consecrate bishops in a sermon at an ordination Mass in Écône on 29 June 1987, in which he declared that "Rome is in darkness, in the darkness of error", and that "the bishops of the whole world are following the false ideas of the Council with their ecumenism and liberalism." He concluded: "This is why it is likely that before I give account of my life to the good Lord, I shall have to consecrate some bishops."

Discussions with the Holy See 
Lefebvre and the Holy See engaged in dialogue and, on 5 May 1988, Lefebvre and Cardinal Joseph Ratzinger (the future Pope Benedict XVI) signed the text of an agreement intended to end the dispute and open the way for the consecration of a successor to Lefebvre. In the first, doctrinal, part of the document, Lefebvre, in his own name and on behalf of the SSPX, promised fidelity to the Catholic Church and to the Pope, accepted the doctrine contained in section 25 of the Second Vatican Council's Dogmatic Constitution Lumen gentium on the Church's magisterium, pledged a non-polemical attitude of communication with the Holy See on the problematic aspects of Vatican II, recognized the validity of the revised sacraments, and promised to respect the common discipline of the Church and her law.  The second, legal part of the document envisaged that the SSPX would become a Society of Apostolic Life with certain exemptions, it would have the faculty to celebrate the Tridentine rites, a special commission including two members of the SSPX to resolve conflicts, and a member of the SSPX to be consecrated as a bishop.

This document was to be submitted to the Pope for his approval. However, Lefebvre quickly came to the view that he was being enticed into a trap. The very next day, he declared he was obliged in conscience to proceed, with or without papal approval, to ordain on 30 June a bishop to succeed him.

A further meeting took place in Rome on 24 May. Lefebvre was now promised that the Pope would appoint a bishop from among the members of the SSPX, chosen according to the normal procedures and that the consecration would take place on 15 August, at the close of the Marian year. In return, Lefebvre would have to request reconciliation with the Pope on the basis of the protocol of 5 May. Lefebvre requested in writing that the consecration of three bishops take place on 30 June and that the majority of the members of the special commission must be from the SSPX.  On the Pope's instructions, Ratzinger replied on 30 May to Lefebvre concerning these requests, "[O]n the question of the commission, whose purpose was to favour reconciliation, not to make decisions, the Holy Father thought it best to keep to the agreement that Lefebvre had signed on 5 May"; on the question of the ordination of bishops, the Pope reiterated his readiness to speed up the usual process so as to nominate a member of the Society to be consecrated on 15 August, and Lefebvre was asked to provide the necessary information on candidates for this purpose, but, Ratzinger added, "Since you have announced again recently your intention to ordain three bishops on 30 June with or without the agreement of Rome, you must state clearly that you entrust yourself to the Holy Father's decision in full obedience."

Consecration of four bishops 
On 3 June, Lefebvre wrote from Écône, stating that he intended to proceed with the consecrations. On 9 June, the Pope replied to him with a personal letter, appealing to him not to proceed with a design that "would be seen as nothing other than a schismatic act, the theological and canonical consequences of which are known to you."

On 17 June, Cardinal Bernardin Gantin, Prefect of the Congregation for Bishops sent the proposed bishops a formal canonical warning that they would automatically incur the penalty of excommunication if they were ordained by Lefebvre without papal permission.

On 29 June, Ratzinger sent a telegram to Lefebvre to say that "For the love of Christ and His Church, the Holy Father asks you paternally and firmly to depart today for Rome, without proceeding on 30 June with the episcopal ordinations that you have announced."

On 30 June, Lefebvre consecrated four SSPX priests: Bernard Fellay, Bernard Tissier de Mallerais, Richard Williamson and Alfonso de Galarreta. A later SSPX account said that Bishop de Castro Mayer participated with his "crucial presence" and was "found at Archbishop Lefebvre's side", but did not specifically describe him as participating in the consecration ritual. However, another SSPX article says both Lefebvre and de Castro Mayer consecrated the bishops.

Excommunications
Two hours after the consecration, the Holy See released a statement saying Lefebvre and the four bishops he consecrated had excommunicated themselves by defying papal authority and by ignoring warnings including a last-minute appeal from John Paul II.

On the following day, 1 July 1988, the Vatican's Congregation for Bishops issued a decree signed by Cardinal Bernardin Gantin, Prefect of the Congregation, declaring that Lefebvre, Fellay, Tissier de Mallerais, Williamson, de Galarreta, and de Castro Mayer had incurred automatic excommunication. 

On 2  July, Pope John Paul II, in his apostolic letter Ecclesia Dei, condemned the Archbishop's action, The Pope stated that, since schism is defined in canon 751 of the 1983 Code of Canon Law as "withdrawal of submission to the Supreme Pontiff or from communion with the members of the Church subject to him", the consecration "constitute[d] a schismatic act." The Pope declared: "In performing such an act, notwithstanding the formal canonical warning sent to them by the Cardinal Prefect of the Congregation for Bishops on 17 June last, Mons. Lefebvre and the priests Bernard Fellay, Bernard Tissier de Mallerais, Richard Williamson, and Alfonso de Galarreta have incurred the grave penalty of excommunication envisaged by ecclesiastical law", a reference to canon 1382 of the 1983 Code of Canon Law. However, Bishop de Castro Mayer was not listed.

Lefebvre declared that he had not withdrawn his submission to the Pope and that canons 1323 and 1324 of the Code absolved him of culpability because of the crisis in the Church. Canon 1324 provides that, when someone wrongly believes that there is a state of necessity that compels him to perform a canonically illegal act (even if his ignorance on this point is culpable, provided that the act in question is not inherently evil or tending to the harm of souls), the canonical penalty for the relevant act is to be reduced or replaced, and automatic penalties do not apply. The Holy See rejects this argument as irrelevant, both because Lefebvre had been served with express canonical warnings and because of the rule in canon 1325 that ignorance which is "crass or supine or affected" provides no defence under canons 1323 and 1324.

Cardinal Darío Castrillón Hoyos considers that the consecration was not a schismatic act, on the basis that Lefebvre was merely consecrating auxiliary bishops rather than attempting to establish a parallel church. In line with general canonical opinion, the Holy See holds that Archbishop Lefebvre committed a schismatic act, but not that he created a schismatic Church. Accordingly, when Cardinal Edward Idris Cassidy presented a revised edition of the Vatican's Directory for the Application of Principles and Norms on Ecumenism, he stated that "[t]he situation of the members of [the SSPX] is an internal matter of the Catholic Church." Viewing Lefebvre's action as schismatic, a number of former members and supporters of the SSPX resigned or withdrew their support from the Society and joined the newly founded (and Vatican-approved) Priestly Fraternity of St. Peter.

Lifting of excommunications 

By a decree of 21 January 2009 (Protocol Number 126/2009), issued in response to a request that Fellay made on behalf of all four bishops whom Lefebvre had consecrated, the Prefect of the Congregation for Bishops, by the power expressly granted to him by Pope Benedict XVI, remitted the automatic excommunication that they had thereby incurred, and expressed the wish that this would be followed speedily by full communion of the whole of the Society of Saint Pius X with the Church, thus bearing witness, by the proof of visible unity, to true loyalty and true recognition of the Pope's Magisterium and authority.

Fellay, superior general of SSPX, issued a statement in which the society expressed its "filial gratitude to the Holy Father for this gesture which, beyond the Priestly Society of Saint Pius X, will benefit the whole Church," and that the " wishes always to be more able to help the pope to remedy the unprecedented crisis which presently shakes the Catholic world, and which Pope John Paul II had designated as a state of 'silent apostasy'."

Some expressed surprise at the favour that the Pope had thus shown to bishops holding such positions, with particular regard to Bishop Williamson, who was accused as a Holocaust denier. The inclusion of this bishop presented problems for Catholic-Jewish relations, culminating in the Chief Rabbinate of Israel temporarily severing ties with the Vatican in protest.

References

External links
 Video of the episcopal consecrations on June 30, 1988, Écône, Switzerland.

 
1988 in Switzerland
Traditionalist Catholicism
Society of Saint Pius X
Catholic Church in Switzerland
Schisms from the Catholic Church